Plastik Funk are a music duo consisting of Rafael Ximenez-Carrillo and Mikio Gruschinske who teamed up with Tujamo and Sneakbo for their single "Dr. Who!", which peaked at number 21 on the UK Singles Chart.

Background
Plastik Funk were formed in 2002 while Ximenez-Carrillo and Gruschinke were at high school. Ximenez-Carrillo was born in Madrid but emigrated to Grevenbroich, Nordrhein-Westfalen, whereas Gruschinke spent the former part of his life in Tokyo before settling in Berlin. They began DJing hip-hop at high school but after hearing the works of Frankie Knuckles and David Morales, switched to house. They met after becoming the DJs at two different nightclubs in Düsseldorf, They released their debut, the "Do It Right" EP, in 2003, and a string of club hits enabled them to tour around Germany and beyond. Since then they have remixed the likes of David Guetta, Robyn, Shaggy, and Deadmau5.

In 2011, they released thirteen singles, one of which was their first hit - a cover of C+C Music Factory's Everybody Dance Now, which penetrated the German charts. As a result, they were asked to commission a number of compilation album, including the German Ministry of Sound's 2009 Sessions. Their largest hit, Who, was first released in 2012 and gained the acclaim of Avicii, and was played at the Miami club the Winter Music Conference. Following its success, they toured all over the world and started living in Spain. In 2014, Who was remixed and turned into Dr. Who! ft. Sneakbo, which charted at #21 on the UK Singles Chart.

In 2018  Raphael Ximenez-Carrillo start touring without  Mikio Gruschinske, because  Mikio has problem with his back.

On 3 January 2020, Plastik Funk, with Nervo and Tim Morrison, released a cover of Pointer Sisters' "Dare Me".

As lead artist

References

German musical duos
Electronic music duos
Musical groups established in 2002